Osipaonica  is a Village in the municipality of Smederevo, Serbia. According to the 2002 census, the village has a population of 4071 people.

References

Populated places in Podunavlje District